Porta San Giovanni may refer to
Porta San Giovanni (Padua)
Porta San Giovanni (Rome)
Porta San Giovanni (San Gimignano)